"I Saved the World Today" is a song recorded by British pop music duo Eurythmics for their eighth studio album, Peace (1999). It was written and co-produced by band members Annie Lennox and David A. Stewart.

The song was released as the first single from the album and returned Eurythmics to the UK singles chart for the first time in nearly a decade, peaking at number 11. It peaked within the top 10 in several countries, including Finland, Greece, Hungary, and Italy. In the United States, the song was added to adult contemporary radio in January 2000.

Charts

Release history

References

19 Recordings singles
1999 singles
1999 songs
Arista Records singles
Bertelsmann Music Group singles
Eurythmics songs
Music videos directed by Sophie Muller
RCA Records singles
Songs written by Annie Lennox
Songs written by David A. Stewart